Jatani is a Vidhan Sabha constituency of Khordha district, Odisha, India.

This constituency includes Jatani, Jatani block and 6 Gram panchayats (Gadahaladia, Keranga, Malipur, Tangiapada, Pubusahi and
Nalipada-Arjunpur) of Khurda block and 3 GPs (Padhanasahi, Chandaka, Darutheng, Andharua, Paikerapur, Mendhasal, Tamando, Nanput, Kantabad and Patrapada) of Bhubaneswar block.

Elected Members

Ten elections were held between 1974 and 2014.
Elected members from the Jatani constituency are:

2019: (115): Suresh Kumar Routray (Congress)
2014: (115): Bhagirathi Badajena (BJD) 
2009: (115): Bibhuti Bhusan Balabantaray (BJD) 
2004: (51): Sarat Chandra Paikray  (BJD)
2000: (51): Suresh Kumar Routray (Congress) 
1995: (51): Suresh Kumar Routray (Congress) 
1990: (51): Sarat Chandra Paikray (Janata Dal)
1985: (51): Suresh Kumar Routray (Congress)
1980: (51): Suresh Kumar Routray (Congress-I)
1977: (51): Suresh Kumar Routray (Janata Party)
1974: (51): Satyapriya Mohanty (UTC)

2019 Election Result

2014 Election Results
In 2014 election, Biju Janata Dal candidate Bhagirathi Badajena defeated Indian National Congress candidate Suresh Kumar Routray by a margin of 5747 votes.

2009 Election Results
In 2009 election, Biju Janata Dal candidate Bibhuti Bhusan Balabantaray defeated Indian National Congress candidate Suresh Kumar Routray by a margin of 14,925 votes.

Notes

References

Assembly constituencies of Odisha
Khordha district